Connor Scutt (born 15 April 1996) is an English professional darts player who competes in Professional Darts Corporation events.

Career
At Q-School in 2022, Scutt won his Tour Card on by finishing third of the UK Q-School Order of Merit, to get himself a two-year card on the PDC circuit.

Scutt qualified for the 2022 WDF World Darts Championship, which he was allowed to play after getting special dispensation from the PDC, but he would lose in the first round to Shawn Burt of Canada.

World Championship results

WDF
 2022: First round (lost to Shawn Burt 0–2)

Performance timeline

PDC European Tour

References

External links

1996 births
Living people
Professional Darts Corporation current tour card holders
People from Carshalton
English darts players